The First Baltic Front (Russian: Пéрвый Прибалтийский фронт) was a major formation of the Red Army during the Second World War. It was commanded by Army General Andrey Yeryomenko, succeeded by Army General Bagramyan. It was formed by renaming the Kalinin Front on 12 October 1943, and took part in several important military operations, most notably Bagration in the summer of 1944. The 1st Baltic Front also assisted in lifting the siege of Leningrad on 27 January 1944, as well as in Operation Samland, at that time known as the Samland Group, captured Königsberg in April 1945.

Composition
As of 23 June 1944, the First Baltic Front consisted of the following units and their commanders:

Baltic Front, led by front commander Army General Hovhannes Bagramyan

4th Shock Army, led by General-Lieutenant Pyotr Malyshev
83rd Rifle Corps
6th Guards Army, led by General Lieutenant Ivan Chistyakov 
2nd Guards Rifle Corps
22nd Guards Rifle Corps
23rd Guards Rifle Corps
103rd Guards Rifle Corps
Army artillery
43rd Army, led by General Lieutenant Afanasy Beloborodov 
1st Rifle Corps
60th Rifle Corps
92nd Rifle Corps
1st Tank Corps
3rd Air Army, led by General Lieutenant N. F. Papivin
11th Fighter Aviation Corps

Leaders

Commander
Army General Andrey Yeremenko (October – 19 November 1943)
Army General Ivan Bagramyan (19 November 1943 – February 1945)

Military Commissar
Lieutenant General Dmitry Leonov (October 1943 – November 1944)
Lieutenant General Mikhail Rudakov (November 1944 – February 1945)

Chief of Staff
Colonel General Vladimir Kurasov (October 1943 – February 1945)

References

Zaloga, Steven J. Bagration 1944 - The Destruction of Army Group Center. New York: Osprey Publishing, 1996, p. 24 

Baltic 1